Nama aretioides is a species of flowering plant in the borage family known by the common name ground nama. It is native to the western United States, including much of the Great Basin and Pacific Northwest, where it grows in many types of dry and sandy habitat types, including sagebrush.

It is a densely hairy annual plant forming a small patch on the ground with prostrate stems no more than 12 centimeters long. The small leaves are sickle-shaped and coated in coarse hairs. The inflorescence is a cluster of many flowers in shades of white to very light to dark pink, to purplish. Each flower is tubular, opening into a flat face with five partially fused, rounded lobes. The fruit is a capsule a few millimeters in length.

External links
Jepson Manual Treatment
Photo gallery

aretioides
Flora of California
Flora of the Great Basin
Flora of the Northwestern United States
Flora without expected TNC conservation status